Drumburgh Castle is a medieval pele tower in the village of Drumburgh, in Cumbria, England.

History
A pele tower was originally built on this site, near the village of Burgh, by Robert le Brun in 1307, on the site of a former tower that had been part of Hadrian's Wall. The construction used red sandstone masonry from the wall for its construction. Thomas Dacre rebuilt the castle in 1518, producing what contemporaries described as "neither castle nor tower but a house of strength". The house was altered again between 1678 and 1681 by John Alglionby, producing the current design. The property today has a distinctive first floor doorway and staircase - a later addition to the castle - decorated with the Dacre coat of arms, and has parts of a Roman shrine incorporated into its stonework.

See also

Grade I listed buildings in Cumbria
Listed buildings in Bowness
Castles in Great Britain and Ireland
List of castles in England

References

Bibliography
Pettifer, Adrian. (2002) English Castles: a Guide by Counties. Woodbridge, UK: Boydell Press. .
Richards, Mark and Roger Clegg. (2008) The Spirit of Hadrian's Wall. Cicerone Press. .

Grade I listed buildings in Cumbria
Allerdale